The  is an archaeological site containing a group of a twenty   tombs located in the Haramachi area of the city of Minamisōma, in Fukushima Prefecture in the southern Tōhoku region of northern Japan. The largest of these tombs has been protected by the central government as a National Historic Site since December 23, 1974.

Overview
The tombs are located on a hillside north of the Ota River, and were discovered by chance during the construction of a modern housing district in 1973. The largest of the tombs has a length of 8.3 meters, with a three-meter vestibule, in a rectangular layout, with a 3 by 2.8 meter opening. On the far wall, the tomb is decorated with designs in red iron oxide, depicting people, a horse, a sawtooth-like geometric design, red deer and spirals connected by red and white lines. The back wall and ceiling are also decorated with more than 250 red and white spots. The presence of these decorations makes the tomb the northernmost decorated kofun discovered so far. Relics found within the tomb include bronze and gilt sword fittings, knives, glass and bronze beads, horse fittings and Sue ware pottery. From these grave goods it is estimated that the tomb dates from sometime in the 6th century AD.

The tomb was formerly open to the public four times per year; however, it has been closed since the 2011 Great Tohoku Earthquake. Full-scale replicas and excavated artifacts are on display at the Minamisōma City Museum. The site is approximately 45 minutes on foot from Haranomachi Station on the JR East Joban Line.

See also

List of Historic Sites of Japan (Fukushima)

References

External links
Minamisōma home page 

Kofun
Minamisōma
Historic Sites of Japan
Archaeological sites in Japan
History of Fukushima Prefecture